This is a list of episodes of the television series Private Secretary (known as Susie in syndication). The series aired on CBS from February 1953, to March 1957 for a total of 104 episodes.

Series overview

Episodes

Season 1 (1953)

Season 2 (1953–54)

Season 3 (1954–55)

Season 4 (1955–56)

Season 5 (1956–57)

References

External links

Private Secretary